The 1997 NCAA Skiing Championships were contested at the Stowe Mountain Resort in Stowe, Vermont as the 44th annual NCAA-sanctioned ski tournament to determine the individual and team national champions of men's and women's collegiate slalom and cross-country skiing in the United States.

Defending champions Utah, coached by Pat Miller, won the team championship, the Utes' ninth title overall and eighth as a co-ed team.

Venue

This year's NCAA skiing championships were hosted at the Stowe Mountain Resort in Stowe, Vermont

These were the seventh championships held in the state of Vermont (1955, 1961, 1973, 1980, 1986, 1990, and 1997) and fourth at Stowe (1980, 1986, 1990, and 1997).

Program

Men's events
 Cross country, 20 kilometer freestyle
 Cross country, 10 kilometer classical
 Slalom
 Giant slalom

Women's events
 Cross country, 15 kilometer freestyle
 Cross country, 5 kilometer classical
 Slalom
 Giant slalom

Team scoring

 DC – Defending champions
 Debut team appearance

See also
 List of NCAA skiing programs

References

1997 in sports in Vermont
NCAA Skiing Championships
NCAA Skiing Championships
1997 in alpine skiing
1997 in cross-country skiing